Model Dockyard was a company which made and sold Models, toys and parts for modellers (not to be confused with the Stevens Model Dockyard or Clyde Model Dockyard - later companies dealing in similar products). Established 1774, it was located in Fleet Street, London.

Products
Model Dockyard's products included model sailing boats and hulls, steam boats, boat fittings, stationary steam engines, marine engines, steam cranes, traction engines, steam fire engines, railway locomotives, railway rolling stock, track, lineside accessories, steam engine parts, boilers, and similar items.

Company name
The name of the company implies that they may initially have supplied ship models to the Admiralty, like Clyde Model Dockyard and Stevens Model Dockyard.

References

Steam engines
Toy retailers of the United Kingdom
British companies established in 1774
Toy steam engine manufacturers
1774 establishments in England